Hohenzollern-Sigmaringen was a principality in Southwestern Germany. Its rulers belonged to the senior Swabian branch of the House of Hohenzollern. The Swabian Hohenzollerns were elevated to princes in 1623. The small sovereign state with the capital city of Sigmaringen was annexed to the Kingdom of Prussia in 1850 following the abdication of its sovereign in the wake of the revolutions of 1848, then became part of the newly created Province of Hohenzollern.

History
The senior Swabian branch is not as well known to history, as is the junior Franconian line which became Burgraves of Nuremberg and later ruled Brandenburg and Prussia, and the German Empire.

The County of Hohenzollern-Sigmaringen was created in 1576, upon the partition of the County of Hohenzollern, a fief of the Holy Roman Empire. When the last count of Hohenzollern, Karl I (1512–1579) died, the territory was divided among his three sons:
 Eitel Friedrich IV of Hohenzollern-Hechingen (1545–1605)
 Charles II of Hohenzollern-Sigmaringen (1547–1606)
 Christoph of Hohenzollern-Haigerloch (1552–1592)

The Princes of Hohenzollern-Sigmaringen ruled over a small principality in southwest Germany, with a seat at Sigmaringen Castle. Unlike the Hohenzollerns of Brandenburg-Prussia, the Hohenzollerns of Sigmaringen remained Roman Catholic, along with their cousins of Hohenzollern-Hechingen (the senior line of the Swabian branch of the House of Hohenzollern) and Hohenzollern-Haigerloch.

The principality became a sovereign state in 1815 after the abolition of the Holy Roman Empire in 1806 and an independent realm following the Napoleonic Wars in 1815. Its ruler, Charles, was deposed in the revolutions of 1848. His son, Karl Anton, succeeded him, and turned to Prussia for aid. Prussian troops arrived in August 1849, and in a treaty signed in December Hohenzollern-Sigmaringen was annexed by Prussia, effective in March 1850. The annexation of their state did not, however, mean the end of the importance of the House of Hohenzollern-Sigmaringen.

The last prince, Karl Anton, served as Minister President of Prussia from 1858–61. Karl Anton's second son, Karl Eitel of Hohenzollern-Sigmaringen became prince (1866–1881) and then King of Romania, under the name Carol (reigned 1881–1914). The house remained on the throne until the end of the Romanian monarchy in 1947. The last King of Romania, Michael, died on 5 December 2017.

Because the eldest Hechingen line of the Hohenzollerns became extinct in 1869 with the death of Constantine, Prince of Hohenzollern-Hechingen, the head of the Sigmaringen branch, Karl Anton, dropped his line's suffix and took the title of Prince (Fürst) of (all) Hohenzollern.

French opposition to the candidacy of Carol's elder brother Prince Leopold for the throne of Spain triggered the Franco-Prussian War (1870–1871), which led to the founding of the German Empire in January 1871.

Territories, titles and styles

Southern Germany

Jurisdiction
The head of the Swabian branch of Hohenzollern-Sigmaringen ruled over the following territories:
 county of Hohenzollern (1061)
 burgraviate of Nuremberg (1192)
 county of Veringen (1535)
 lordship of Haigerloch (1634)
 lordship of Wehrstein (1634)
 county of Bergh (1781)

From 1061 until 1806 five of these fiefs (not including Nuremberg) constituted an immediate territory of the Holy Roman Empire under the counts of Zollern, vassals of the Holy Roman Emperor.

From 1806 until 1813 the Hohenzollern lands were a realm of the Confederation of the Rhine, a short-lived state set up by Napoleon I Bonaparte. From 1815 until 1849 the principality was a sovereign country and a member of the German Confederation. In 1849 it lost its independence, and was incorporated into the Kingdom of Prussia as the Province of Hohenzollern.

The German Confederation was succeeded in 1866 by the North German Confederation, which itself was succeeded by the German Empire in 1871. In 1918, the kingdom of Prussia became the Free State of Prussia, and the German Empire was replaced by the Weimar Republic. In 1933 the republic was replaced by the Third Reich. After the defeat of the Nazis the province of Hohenzollern was merged with other territories into the state of Württemberg-Hohenzollern. This state was part of the Allied Occupation Zones in Germany until 1952. In that year, the state of Württemberg-Hohenzollern was merged into Baden-Württemberg, a state of the Federal Republic of Germany.

Karl Friedrich, Prince of Hohenzollern is the head of the princely Swabian line.

Titles
The head of the House of Hohenzollern-Sigmaringen is the historical heir to the titles of:
 Prince (Fürst) of Hohenzollern
 Burgrave (Burggraf) of Nuremberg
 Imperial Count (Reichsgraf) of Hohenzollern
 Count (Graf) of Sigmaringen
 Count (Graf) of Veringen
 Count (Graf) of Bergh
 Lord (Herr) of Haigerloch
 Lord (Herr) of Wehrstein

Styles
The historical titulature of rulers of the House of Hohenzollern was, in the German original: Seine Durchlaucht (S.D.) [name] von Gottes Gnaden, Fürst von Hohenzollern, Burggraf von Nürnberg, Graf zu Sigmaringen, Veringen und Berg, Herr zu Haigerloch und Wehrstein

The English translation is: His Serene Highness (HSH) [name] by the Grace of God, Prince of Hohenzollern, Burgrave of Nuremberg, Count of Sigmaringen, Veringen and Berg, Lord of Haigerloch and Wehrstein.

Romanian branch 

The modern state of Romania was formed by union of the principalities of Moldavia and Wallachia in 1859, under the prince domnitor Alexandru Ioan Cuza. He was replaced by Karl Eitel of Hohenzollern-Sigmaringen in 1866, who ascended the throne as Carol I, Prince of Romania.

During the Russo-Turkish War, Romania, which was a functionally independent vassal of the Ottoman Empire, proclaimed its full independence. After the commander of the Russian armies had requested Romania's help, Carol accepted to enter the war with the condition of being appointed as commander of the armies that were besieging Plevna. After the end of the Romanian War of Independence in the 1878, at the Treaty of Berlin, Romania was subsequently recognized as an independent state by the Great Powers.

In return for reverting to the Russian Empire three southern Bessarabian districts that had been regained by Moldavia after the Crimean War in 1852, Dobruja was acquired.

In 1881, the principality was raised to a kingdom and Prince Carol became King Carol I. He reigned until his death in 1914, and was succeeded by his nephew, Ferdinand. Shortly after taking the throne, Ferdinand, a Roman Catholic like his predecessor, agreed to have his children reared in the Romanian Orthodox Church.

In 1918 Transylvania and Bessarabia were incorporated. In 1918–19, confirmed by the Treaty of Versailles of 1919 and the Treaty of Trianon of 1920, most of the Banat became part of Romania.  Also, Bukovina was incorporated in 1918.

Ferdinand died in 1927. His eldest son, Crown Prince Carol, having renounced his rights, Carol's only son Michael ascended the throne. In 1930, however, Carol reclaimed the throne and was crowned Carol II. Carol was forced to abdicate in 1940, and Michael re-mounted the throne. His reign, and that of the dynasty, ended when he was forced to abdicate by a communist regime in 1947.

On 10 May 2011, following lawsuits brought in Germany against his family by his German relatives regarding attribution of the title Prince of Hohenzollern-Veringen to his son-in-law, Radu Duda, Michael severed dynastic ties with the princely house of Hohenzollern-Sigmaringen, changed the name of his family to "of Romania", and ceased the use of all princely titles borne by him and his family that derived from the German Hohenzollerns.

Titles
The head of the Romanian branch continued, since abolition of the monarchy, to use the hereditary title he bore while reigning:
 Michael I, King of Romania

During the reign of Carol II of Romania his son, Michael, was styled "Măria Sa (M.S.) Marele Voievod de Alba Iulia" or the English translation "His Highness The Grand Voivode of Alba Julia".

Styles
The Romanian original is: Majestatea Sa (M.S.) N.N., Regele Românilor (or Maiestatea Sa (M.S.) N.N., Regele României; both forms are accepted by the Romanian Academy)

The English translation is: His Majesty (H.M.) N.N., King of Romania

Coats of arms

Southern Germany

Major coat of arms

The combined coat of arms of the House of Hohenzollern-Sigmaringen is:

 Escutcheon: quartering of the shield, parted per pale, twice parted per fess, with an inescutcheon
 first sixth: Burgraviate of Nuremberg (1214), on or (gold) a lion rampant sable (black) and a bordure of argent (silver) and gules (red)
 second sixth: Hereditary Chamberlain of the Holy Roman Empire (1504), on gules (red, two crossed scepters in or (gold) 
 third sixth: Lordship of Haigerloch and Wehrstein (1634), parted per fess gules (red) and argent (silver) 
 fourth sixth: Countship of Sigmaringen (1535), on gules (red) a deer or (gold) 
 fifth sixth: Countship of Veringen (1535), on or (gold) three deerhorns horizontally with twice four, and once three antlerpoints gules (red) 
 sixth sixth: County of Berg (1781), on argent (white) a lion rampant gules (red) and a bordure of sable (black) with roundels or (gold) 
 inescutcheon: Countship of Zollern (1061), quarterly sable (black) and argent (silver)
 helm: or (gold) a helmet barred and affronté (sovereign), crowned with a coronet of a German prince (Fürstenkrone)
 crest: sable (black) and argent (white) a head and shoulders of a German hound (Deutsche Bracke) (1317)
 wreath: sable (black) and argent (white)
 mantling: manteld sable (black), doubled argent (white) upon a crowned (Fürstenkrone) baldeqin gules (red), doubled ermine
 motto:
 until the 19th century:  (We were always good Zollern)
 from the 19th century onwards: Nihil Sine Deo (Nothing without God)

Family coat of arms

The combined coat of arms with inclusion of the House coat of arms of the House of Hohenzollern-Sigmaringen is:

 Escutcheon: quartering of the shield, parted per pale, twice parted per fess, with an inescutcheon
 first sixth: Burgraviate of Nuremberg (1214), on or (gold) a lion rampant sable (black) and a bordure of argent (silver) and gules (red)
 second sixth: Hereditary Chamberlain of the Holy Roman Empire, on gules (red, two crossed scepters in or (gold) 
 third sixth: Lordship of Haigerloch and Wehrstein (1634), parted per fess gules (red) and argent (silver) 
 fourth sixth: Countship of Sigmaringen (1535), on gules (red) a deer or (gold)
 fifth sixth: Countship of Veringen (1535), on or (gold) three dearhorns horizontally with twice four, and once three antlerpoints gules (red) 
 sixth sixth: County of Berg (1781), on argent (white) a lion rampant gules (red) and a bordure of sable (black) with roundels or (gold) 
 inescutcheon: Countship of Zollern (1061), quarterly sable (black) and argent (silver)
 helm: seven particular helmets, equivalent to the seven particular coat of arms (Hohenzollern, Nuremberg, Sigmaringen, Veringen, Berg, Haigerloch and Wehrstein)
 crest: seven particular crests, equivalent to the seven particular coat of arms (Hohenzollern, Nuremberg, Sigmaringen, Veringen, Berg, Haigerloch and Wehrstein)
 wreath: sable (black) and argent (white)
 mantling: manteld sable (black), doubled argent (white)
 supporter: two German hounds
 compartment: grassy

Romania

The major coat of arms of the kingdom of the Romanians consisted, from 1922 onwards, of:

 an escutcheon of the combination of the territories of  :
 Wallachia 
 Moldavia 
 Dobruja 
 Transylvania 
 Bessarabia 
 Banat 
 Oltenia 
 Bukovina 
 an inescutcheon of the House of Hohenzollern (quarterly sable (black) and argent (silver)
 helm: The Steel Crown of Romania
 mantling: a crowned baldeqin gules (red), doubled ermine
 motto: Nihil Sine Deo (Nothing without God)
 supporter: two rampant lions
 compartment: ground

Rulers
Members of the House of Hohenzollern reigned as monarchs in Europe.

Southern Germany

Counts (Grafen) of Hohenzollern (1576–1623) 

 Karl II, Count 1576–1606 (1547–1606), second surviving son of Karl I of Hohenzollern
  Johann, Count 1606–1623 (1578–1638), created Reichsfürst von Hohenzollern-Sigmaringen 1623

Princes (Fürsten) of Hohenzollern-Sigmaringen (1623–1849) 

 Johann, 1st Prince 1623–1638 (1578–1638)
  Meinrad I, 2nd Prince 1638–1681 (1605–1681)
  Maximilian, 3rd Prince 1681–1689 (1636–1689)
  Meinrad II, 4th Prince 1689–1715 (1673–1715)
  Josef Friedrich Ernst, 5th Prince 1715–1769 (1702–1769)
  Karl Friedrich, 6th Prince 1769–1785 (1724–1785)
  Anton Aloys, 7th Prince 1785–1831 (1762–1831)
  Karl, 8th Prince 1831–1848 (1785–1853), abdicated 1848
  Karl Anton, 9th Prince 1848–1849 (1811–1885), ceded sovereignty to Prussia 1849

(1849–present) 

Following cession of their sovereignty over the principality to their kinsmen the Kings of Prussia in 1849, the heirs of Karl Anton continued to bear the same title, "Prince (Fürst) of Hohenzollern":

 Karl Anton, Prince 1849–1885 (1811–1885), became Prince of Hohenzollern on the death of the last Prince of Hohenzollern-Hechingen in 1869
  Leopold, Prince 1885–1905 (1835–1905)
 Wilhelm, Prince 1905–1927 (1864–1927)
 Friedrich, Prince 1927–1965 (1891–1965)
 Friedrich Wilhelm, Prince 1965–2010 (1924–2010)
 Karl Friedrich, Prince 2010–present (born 1952)
  Alexander, Hereditary Prince (born 1987)
 Prince Albrecht of Hohenzollern (born 1954)
  Prince Ferdinand of Hohenzollern (born 1960)
 Prince Aloys of Hohenzollern (1999)
  Prince Fidelis of Hohenzollern (born 2001)
 Prince Johann Georg of Hohenzollern (1932–2016)
 Prince Carl Christian of Hohenzollern (born 1962)
  Prince Nicolas of Hohenzollern (born 1999)
  Prince Hubertus of Hohenzollern (born 1966)
  Franz Joseph, Prince of Hohenzollern-Emden (1891–1964)
  Prince Emanuel of Hohenzollern-Emden (1929–1999)
  Prince Carl Alexander of Hohenzollern-Emden (born 1970)

Romania

Princes of Romania (1866–1881) 
 Carol I 1866–1881

King of Romania (1881–1947) 
 Carol I 1881–1914
 Ferdinand 1914–1927
 Michael 1927–1930
 Carol II 1930–1940
 Michael 1940–1947

See also
 House of Hohenzollern
 Sigmaringen
 Sigmaringen Castle

References

External links
 Official website of the House of Hohenzollern-Sigmaringen – heraldic background information
 The official website of The Romanian Royal Family
 "Das Fürstliche Haus Hohenzollern-Sigmaringen" by Hartmut Platte (in German)

1576 establishments in the Holy Roman Empire
1850 disestablishments in Europe
States and territories established in 1576
 
Former states and territories of Baden-Württemberg
States of the German Confederation
States of the Confederation of the Rhine
Counties of the Holy Roman Empire
Early Modern history of Germany